The Gujatat State Football Association Club Championship was founded by Gujarat State Football Association (GSFA) in 2022 as the top state-level football league in the Indian state of Gujarat. The league is top tier of the state and the 4th tier in Indian football league system.

Current teams
Eight final round teams from the previous edition along with the two teams from qualifiers participated in the 2022–23 season of Gujarat SFA Club Championship.

Champions

See also
Indian State Leagues
Mumbai Football League
Goa Professional League

References

External links
 GSFA Official Website

5
League
Football in Gujarat
2022 establishments in India
Recurring sporting events established in 2022